Bratři v triku is a Czech animation studio founded in 1945. Later in 1956, it is now a subsidiary of Krátký film Prague.

History
The studio was founded in 1945. It was responsible for many award-winning films such as Munro. Famous animators such as Zdeněk Miler, Jiří Trnka, Břetislav Pojar. Jiří Brdečka and Zdeněk Smetana are linked with the studio. Also the studio created TV shows and serials, notable are Krtek, Bob a Bobek, Čtyřlístek, Kosí bratři and Mach a Šebestová to name a few. Bratři v Triku became less prominent after Velvet Revolution.

References

External links
 

Czech animation studios
Mass media companies established in 1945
Companies based in Prague
Film production companies of the Czech Republic
Mass media in Prague
1945 establishments in Czechoslovakia